is a Japanese professional footballer who plays as a midfielder for Swiss Super League club Grasshopper Club Zürich, on loan from Premier League club Wolverhampton Wanderers, and the Japan national team.

Club career
Kawabe joined Sanfrecce Hiroshima in 2008, alongside other products of the club's academy. After his debut in 2012, he was offered a full pro contract by Sanfrecce. Despite this achievement, he found too few minutes on the pitch and decided to go to Júbilo Iwata on loan. In January 2018, he came back to Sanfrecce after a three-years loan to Jubilo.

On 8 July 2021, he signed a 3-year contract with Grasshoppers in the Swiss Super League. Due to delays with his work permit, he only made his debut on 7 August 2021 against Lausanne-Sport, being named in the starting lineup and playing 60 minutes. He scored his first goal in a 3-1 away victory over FC Sion on 31 October 2021, scoring the opener in the 32nd minute 

On 5 January 2022, Kawabe joined Premier League side Wolverhampton Wanderers on a three-and-a-half year deal, with the club intending on loaning him back to Grasshoppers in the near future. He returned to Grasshoppers on 19 January 2022 and will remain until the end of the 2022-2023 season. He finished the season at Grasshoppers with 34 appearances, playing every game since gaining eligibility. In his first season in Europe, he scored seven goals and supplied three assists. In the first game of the 2022-23 season, he scored both goals in a 2-1 home win against FC Lugano. As a result, he was voted "SFL Player of the Round" by the viewers from among five nominees.

International career
He made his debut for Japan national football team on 25 March 2021 in a friendly against South Korea. On 7 June 2021, he shot his first international goal, the final goal in a 4-1 victory over Tajikistan in the 2022 FIFA World Cup qualification.

Career statistics

Club

International goals

References

External links
Profile at Sanfrecce Hiroshima 
Profile at Júbilo Iwata

 

1995 births
Association football people from Hiroshima Prefecture
Living people
Japanese footballers
Association football midfielders
J.League U-22 Selection players
Japan international footballers
Sanfrecce Hiroshima players
Júbilo Iwata players
Grasshopper Club Zürich players
Wolverhampton Wanderers F.C. players
J1 League players
J2 League players
J3 League players
Swiss Super League players
Japanese expatriate footballers
Expatriate footballers in Switzerland
Japanese expatriate sportspeople in Switzerland